Cascade is a town in Cascade County, Montana, United States. The population was 600 at the 2020 census. It is part of the Great Falls, Montana Metropolitan Statistical Area, which in 2020 had a population of 84,414. Cascade was incorporated in 1911.

History
The founder of the town was Mr. Thomas Graham. Originally named Dodge, the town changed its name in 1887. This was an appeal to become the county seat of the newly formed county.

Geography
Cascade is located at  (47.271954, -111.702675). Interstate 15 passes through the community, with access from Exits 254 and 256. The town is situated along the Missouri River.

Climate
According to the Köppen Climate Classification system, Cascade has a semi-arid climate, abbreviated "BSk" on climate maps.

Demographics

2010 census
As of the census of 2010, there were 685 people, 287 households, and 188 families living in the town. The racial makeup of the town was 94.9% White, 2.5% Native American, 0.7% from other races, and 1.9% from two or more races. Hispanic or Latino of any race were 2.5% of the population.

There were 287 households, of which 27.5% had children under the age of 18 living with them, 53.3% were married couples living together, 8.4% had a female householder with no husband present, 3.8% had a male householder with no wife present, and 34.5% were non-families. 28.6% of all households were made up of individuals, and 14.7% had someone living alone who was 65 years of age or older. The average household size was 2.32 and the average family size was 2.87.

The median age in the town was 47.6 years. 22% of residents were under the age of 18; 5.8% were between the ages of 18 and 24; 18.3% were from 25 to 44; 31.1% were from 45 to 64; and 22.6% were 65 years of age or older. The gender makeup of the town was 47.3% male and 52.7% female.

2000 census
As of the census of 2000, there were 819 people, 323 households, and 221 families living in the town. The population density was 1,561.9 people per square mile (608.1/km2). There were 349 housing units at an average density of 665.6 per square mile (259.1/km2). The racial makeup of the town was 97.56% White, 0.37% African American, 1.22% Native American, and 0.85% from two or more races. Hispanic or Latino of any race were 0.73% of the population.

There were 323 households, out of which 34.7% had children under the age of 18 living with them, 56.0% were married couples living together, 9.0% had a female householder with no husband present, and 31.3% were non-families. 28.2% of all households were made up of individuals, and 16.7% had someone living alone who was 65 years of age or older. The average household size was 2.54 and the average family size was 3.14.

In the town, the population was spread out, with 30.0% under the age of 18, 6.8% from 18 to 24, 24.4% from 25 to 44, 21.7% from 45 to 64, and 17.0% who were 65 years of age or older. The median age was 40 years. For every 100 females, there were 91.4 males. For every 100 females age 18 and over, there were 94.9 males.

The median income for a household in the town was $30,602, and the median income for a family was $34,938. Males had a median income of $30,446 versus $18,542 for females. The per capita income for the town was $14,219. About 10.0% of families and 12.1% of the population were below the poverty line, including 16.2% of those under age 18 and 10.7% of those age 65 or over.

Education
Cascade Public Schools educates students from kindergarten through 12th grade. It also serves the nearby towns of Ulm, Deep Creek, Craig, and Wolf Creek. The team name for Cascade High School is the Badgers.

Wedsworth Memorial Library is a public library in Cascade.

Notable people
 J. Robert Atkinson, founder of the Braille Institute of America
 Mary Fields a.k.a. "Stagecoach Mary", the first black woman to work for the United States Postal Service, was so popular in the town in the early 20th century that schools closed every year on her birthday.
 Charles Marion Russell, artist
 Steamboat Williams, Major League Baseball player

See also

 List of municipalities in Montana

References

External links

 
 Cascade Public Schools website

Towns in Cascade County, Montana
Montana populated places on the Missouri River